Kenneth George Denbigh FRS (30 May 1911 – 23 January 2004) was an English chemical engineer and scientific philosopher. He wrote much on the issue of time in relation to thermodynamics. He was an associate of the Russian chemist Georgi Gladyshev.

The University of Edinburgh named the Kenneth Denbigh Building at King's Buildings in his honour. They also offer a Kenneth Denbigh Scholarship to science students.

Life

He was born in Luton on 30 May 1911 the son of George Denbigh, manager of Brothertons Chemical Works in Wakefield. He attended the University of Leeds graduating with a BSc in 1932. He then undertook his doctorate under Robert Whytlaw-Gray gaining a PhD in 1934. He worked for Imperial Chemical Industries (ICI) until 1938 when obtained a post of Lecturer in Chemistry at the University of Southampton.

In the Second World War he was taken back into industry, as head of the laboratories for the Royal Ordnance Factory at Bridgwater. This led him into his first hands-on experience with practical issues concerning thermodynamics.

In 1948 he received a post lecturing at the Chemical Engineering Department at the University of Cambridge and this provided a stepping-stone to be Professor of Chemical Technology at the University of Edinburgh in 1955. This in turn took him to Imperial College, London in 1960. In 1966 his final move was to be principal of Queen Elizabeth College in London.

He was elected a Fellow of the Royal Society of London in 1965.

He died in London on 23 January 2004.

Family

He married Kathleen Enoch in 1935. They had two sons.

His son Jonathan Denbigh was also a scientist.

Publications

The Thermodynamics of the Steady State (1951)
Thermodynamics and the Sense of Time (1953)
The Principles of Chemical Equilibrium (1955)
Science, Industry and Social Policy (1963)
Chemical Reactor Theory (1965)
An Inventive Universe (1975)
Three Concepts of Time (1981)
Entropy in Relation to Incomplete Knowledge (1985) ,

References

1911 births
2004 deaths
People from Luton
Fellows of the Royal Society
Alumni of the University of Leeds
Academics of the University of Edinburgh
Academics of Imperial College London
British chemists
20th-century non-fiction writers